Ingebrigt is a given name. Notable people with the name include:

Ingebrigt Davik (1925–1991), Norwegian teacher, children's writer, broadcasting personality, singer and songwriter
Ingebrigt Håker Flaten (born 1971), Norwegian bassist active in the jazz and free jazz genres
Ingebrigt Haldorsen Sæter (1800–1875), Norwegian politician
Ingebrigt Johansson (1904–1987), Norwegian mathematician
Ingebrigt S. Sørfonn (born 1950), Norwegian politician representing the Christian People's Party
Ingebrigt Steen Jensen (born 1955), Norwegian writer, consultant, advertising man and football enthusiast
Ingebrigt Vik (1867–1927), Norwegian sculptor

See also
Ingeberg
Ingeborg